Klášterec (means "little monastery") may refer to:
 Klášterec nad Ohří
 The Chateau at Klášterec nad Ohří
 Klášterec nad Orlicí